Warrington is a census-designated place (CDP) in Escambia County, Florida, United States.

The population was 14,531 at the 2010 census. It is part of the Pensacola–Ferry Pass–Brent Metropolitan Statistical Area.

A failed referendum was held in 1975 to incorporate Warrington as a town. Despite falling outside of city limits and having a post office explicitly named "Warrington", mail going to the addresses in the Warrington ZIP code (32507) falls under the jurisdiction of Pensacola.

Naval Air Station Pensacola is located in Warrington (albeit with their own ZIP code, 32508, which corresponds to the mailing city "Naval Air Station Pensacola, FL").

History
Warrington is named for Lewis Warrington, who served as Secretary of the Navy, and who helped choose the area that became Naval Air Station Pensacola. He served as the first commandant of the newly created Navy Yard, 1826–1827.

Warrington was created shortly after the Pensacola Navy Yard's 1826 foundation.  Commodore Melancthon Taylor Woolsey, the second commandant of the Navy Yard (1827–1831), "created two villages, Warrington,  and Woolsey outside the navy yard for homebuilding." Warrington was between the yard and Fort Barrancas. The town was relocated north of Bayou Grande in the 1930s to make additional space available for the expanding Naval Air Station.

Geography
Warrington is located at  (30.385698, −87.289594).

Demographics

As of the census of 2000, there were 15,207 people, 6,547 households, and 4,046 families residing in the CDP. The racial makeup of the CDP was 71.57% White, 21.69% African American, 1.05% Native American, 2.08% Asian, 0.16% Pacific Islander, 0.91% from other races, and 2.54% from two or more races. Hispanic or Latino of any race were 2.88% of the population.

There were 6,547 households, out of which 28.4% had children under the age of 18 living with them, 38.7% were married couples living together, 18.5% had a female householder with no husband present, and 38.2% were non-families. 31.3% of all households were made up of individuals, and 12.0% had someone living alone who was 65 years of age or older.  The average household size was 2.32 and the average family size was 2.89.

In the CDP, the population was spread out, with 25.7% under the age of 18, 9.4% from 18 to 24, 27.7% from 25 to 44, 21.8% from 45 to 64, and 15.4% who were 65 years of age or older.  The median age was 36 years. For every 100 females, there were 92.3 males.  For every 100 females age 18 and over, there were 87.2 males.

The median income for a household in the CDP was $30,459, and the median income for a family was $35,892. Males had a median income of $29,083 versus $19,375 for females. The per capita income for the CDP was $17,876.  About 17.5% of families and 20.6% of the population were below the poverty line, including 33.8% of those under age 18 and 6.0% of those age 65 or over.

Education
Warrington is part of the Escambia County School District, which serves the entire county.

References

Census-designated places in Escambia County, Florida
Pensacola metropolitan area
Census-designated places in Florida
Populated places on the Intracoastal Waterway in Florida